Leggere Donna (Italian: Reading Woman) is an Italian feminist cultural magazine which features reviews about women-related literary work and about books written by women. The magazine began publication in 1980. It has been published by Luciana Tufani publishing since its inception, and as of 2011 its editor was Luciana Tufani. The headquarters of the magazine is in Ferrara.

References

External links
 Official website
 Magazine info (in Italian)

1980 establishments in Italy
Book review magazines
Feminism in Italy
Feminist magazines
Italian-language magazines
Literary magazines published in Italy
Magazines established in 1980
Mass media in Ferrara
Women's magazines published in Italy